Nina Muradyan (born August 17, 1954 in Yerevan, Armenia) is a former Soviet Armenian volleyball player.

References

External links
 
 

Living people
1954 births
Sportspeople from Yerevan
Armenian women's volleyball players
Soviet women's volleyball players
Olympic volleyball players of the Soviet Union
Volleyball players at the 1976 Summer Olympics
Olympic silver medalists for the Soviet Union
Olympic medalists in volleyball
Soviet Armenians
Medalists at the 1976 Summer Olympics